Through a Glass Window is a 1922 American drama silent film directed by Maurice Campbell, written by Olga Printzlau, and starring May McAvoy, Fanny Midgley, Burwell Hamrick, Raymond McKee, F. A. Turner, and Carrie Clark Ward. It was released on April 2, 1922, by Paramount Pictures.

Plot
As described in a film magazine, Jenny Martin (McAvoy), daughter of an invalid mother (Midgley), makes many friends as a waitress of a doughnut shop on New York City's Lower East Side. Her brother Dan (Hamrick) is arrest for a  theft committed to aid his sister and is sent to a reformatory. Jenny keeps the facts from her mother, who has gone blind. Jenny builds up an independent business for her brother to take over when he returns, and postpones until then her marriage to Italian vendor Tomasso Barilio (McKee). Her brother finally returns and the wedding is in prospect as the film ends.

Cast
May McAvoy as Jenny Martin
Fanny Midgley as Mrs. Martin
Burwell Hamrick as Dan Martin
Raymond McKee as Tomasso Barilio
F. A. Turner as Matt Clancy 
Carrie Clark Ward as Molly Clancy
Frank Butterworth as Jimmy
Wade Boteler as Hartigan
Russ Powell as Coffee Pete

References

External links

1922 films
1920s English-language films
Silent American drama films
1922 drama films
Paramount Pictures films
American black-and-white films
American silent feature films
Films directed by Maurice Campbell
1920s American films